The District Court of Guam (in case citations, D. Guam) is a United States territorial court with jurisdiction over the United States territory of Guam. It sits in the capital, Hagåtña. Appeals of the court's decisions are taken to the United States Court of Appeals for the Ninth Circuit. It is not an Article III court, and therefore its judges do not have life tenure, but are appointed to ten-year terms.

History 

The District Court of Guam was established in 1950 by the Guam Organic Act to have the same jurisdiction as a United States district court.  Under Section 22(a) of the Guam Organic Act, the Court was granted:
 in all causes arising under the laws of the United States, the jurisdiction of a district court of the United States as such court is defined in section 451 of title 28, United States Code;
 original jurisdiction in all other causes in Guam, jurisdiction over which has not been transferred by the legislature to other court or courts established by it, and;
 such appellate jurisdiction as the legislature may determine.
In 1951, the Guam Legislature created Commissioners' Courts, the Police Court, and the Island Court, decisions from which were appealable to the District Court. In 1974, the Legislature consolidated these courts into the Guam Superior Court. The legislature also created a Guam Supreme Court to hear appeals from the Superior Court. However, the Ninth Circuit found in 1976 that the appellate jurisdiction of the District Court could not be transferred without authorization by Congress, and the Supreme Court of the United States upheld this ruling in a 5–4 decision in 1977. Justice Thurgood Marshall wrote the dissenting opinion, in which he argued that Congress had plainly authorized the enactment of the challenged legislation. Further legislation divested the District Court's appellate jurisdiction over local matters in 1994.

The District Court was housed in the Guam Congress Building from 1950 to 1968, in the Courthouse of Guam from 1968 to 1978, in the Pacific News Building from 1978 to 2000, and since then in the United States Courthouse Building.

Current judge 
:

Vacancy and pending nomination

Former judges

See also
 Courts of the United States
 List of current United States district judges
 List of United States federal courthouses in Guam
 Politics of Guam
 Supreme Court of Guam
 United States Attorney for the Districts of Guam and the Northern Mariana Islands
 District Court for the Northern Mariana Islands

References

External links
 District Court of Guam

Government of Guam
Guam
Hagåtña, Guam
1950 establishments in Guam
Courts and tribunals established in 1950